José Pilar Moreno Montoya (born 12 October 1959) is a Mexican politician affiliated with the PRI. He currently serves as Deputy of the LXII Legislature of the Mexican Congress representing Aguascalientes.

References

1959 births
Living people
Politicians from Aguascalientes
Members of the Chamber of Deputies (Mexico)
Institutional Revolutionary Party politicians
21st-century Mexican politicians